Michael Badalucco (born December 20, 1954) is an American actor. He made his screen debut in the film Raging Bull (1980) and subsequently appeared in many films such as Desperately Seeking Susan (1985), Miller's Crossing (1990), Jungle Fever (1991), Mac (1992), Léon: The Professional (1994), Summer of Sam (1999), O Brother, Where Art Thou? (2000) and The Man Who Wasn't There (2001). His breakthrough role came as attorney Jimmy Berlutti in the television series The Practice (1997–2004), for which he won a Primetime Emmy Award in 1999.

Life and career

Badalucco, an Italian American, was born in Flatbush, Brooklyn, New York, the son of Jean, a homemaker, and Joe Badalucco, a set dresser, movie set carpenter and property person. His brother is actor Joseph Badalucco Jr., whose most notable role was Jimmy Altieri in the television series The Sopranos.

He attended Xaverian High School in Brooklyn, graduating in 1972. He was the guest speaker at the 2005 commencement. He later attended SUNY New Paltz in New Paltz, New York. Badalucco has been married to Brenda Heyob since 1996.

Filmography

Film

Television

Awards and nominations

References

External links

1954 births
Living people
American male film actors
American male television actors
American people of Italian descent
Male actors from New York City
Xaverian High School alumni
State University of New York at New Paltz alumni
People from Flatbush, Brooklyn
Outstanding Performance by a Supporting Actor in a Drama Series Primetime Emmy Award winners